Kaalo is a Hindi horror film, directed by Wilson Louis and produced by Yash Patnaik, Mamta Patnaik and Dhaval Gada. The film was released on 17 December 2010 under the Beyond Dreams Entertainment Ltd. banner.

Plot
The film features Kaalo, a devilish witch who lived in Kulbhata during the 18th century. She was killed and buried by angry villagers for sacrificing young girl children to satisfy her greed for immortality, but her fear lived on. Years later villagers spoke of Kaalo's sightings yet again. They claimed she was even more angry and dangerous and she was back to finish what she left incomplete. Kulbhata was vacated overnight by scared villagers. All roads leading to Kulbhata were sealed by horrifying tales of Kaalo killing anyone who dared to enter Kulbhata until a bus carrying eleven passengers on its way to Kuldevi had to pass through Kulbhata. The passengers were- newly wed couple who were on the way to kuldevi for blessings, Aged Brahmin couple who were going to kuldevi to meet their grand daughter, They tried to survived till the last, but unfortunately they both died. Four shameless and drunkyard friends- Namely Chotu, youngest among them and first one to die, Guddu,Chutan(Raj Aryan), He is a greedy and coward man and Sushi, A over-confident man. A NRI couple, who love to give poses and then taking photos of them. One of the passengers on the bus was a twelve-year-old girl named Shona (Swini Khara), who was traveling alone to spend her vacation at her grandmother's house in the neighboring village. Shona was clever, witty and cheerful. She soon became the life of the journey. Everyone loved her endearing manners. Especially the reclusive and reticent Sameer (Aditya Srivastav), who was traveling with a bag loaded with gunpowder to blast a small hillock which would give way to a water canal for his drought hit village. Badly disfigured and thirsty for blood, Kaalo could smell Shona from miles away and headed straight for the bus. She would kill everyone who came in her way, she had to have the girl anyhow. When the passengers suddenly realized they were staring into death everything changed. From being the life of the journey, Shona became their very reason for dying. Everyone wanted her out of the bus, some even used her as a bait to lure Kaalo away from themselves. Human relations changed as they fought for their survival.Kaalo started brutally killing the passengers. The first one to die was Chotu, Then the driver (Hemant Pandey), Then the conductor (Manoj Tiger).Kaalo killed everyone, but at last she was killed by Sameer, along with shona.  This was because no one  except Sameer had the guts to stand up for Shona. It didn't matter to him whether Kaalo was a creature or a witch. All he knew was that he has to protect Shona at any cost because time was running out for him and his co-passengers who were still alive! At the end of the movie, Sameer pierces two sticks in Kaalo's eyes making her blind and inserts a knife in Kaalo's body. Now for Kaalo was not able to see anything, Sameer hangs the gunpowder bag on Kaalo's neck and lights the gunpowder. Kaalo explodes into pieces and goes underneath the earth. At the end of movie, Shona and Sameer go towards home.

Cast
 Swini Khara as Shona
 Aditya Srivastava as Sameer
 Aditya Lakhia as Raghu
 Raj Arjun as Chandan
 Abhijeet Satam as Guddu
 Tripta Parashar as Shaz (Model)
 Kanwarjit Paintal as Pandit Ram Shrivastav
 Madhurima Tuli as Rukmini
 Sheela David as Pandit's Wife
 Hemant Pandey as Bus Driver
 Satish Sharma as Hasmukh Shah
 Prashant Kumar as Nikhil
 Manoj Tiger as Bus Conductor
 Pradeep Kabra as Kaalo

References

External links
 Kaalo at Bollywood Hungama
 

2010 films
2010 horror films
2010s slasher films
Hindi-language horror films
Indian horror films
Films shot in Rajasthan
Films set in Rajasthan
Indian slasher films